The Armenia men's national under-18 ice hockey team is the men's national under-18 ice hockey team of Armenia. The team is managed by the Ice Hockey Federation of Armenia, a member of the International Ice Hockey Federation. The team represents Armenia at the IIHF World U18 Championships.

International competitions

IIHF World U18 Championships 

2005: 3rd in Division III Qualification
2008: 5th in Division III Group B

See also

 Armenian Hockey League
 Armenia men's national junior ice hockey team
 Armenia national ice hockey team
 Ice hockey in Armenia
 Sport in Armenia

External links
Armenia at IIHF.com

Ice hockey in Armenia
National under-18 ice hockey teams
Ice hockey